Anthony 'Tony' Shacklady (26 December 1945 – 25 February 2014) was a male British wrestler.

Wrestling career
Shacklady competed at the 1968 Summer Olympics, the 1972 Summer Olympics and the 1976 Summer Olympics. He represented England and won a silver medal in the 74kg welterweight division, at the 1974 British Commonwealth Games in Christchurch, New Zealand. Four years later he represented England again but in the 82kg division, at the 1978 Commonwealth Games in Edmonton, Alberta, Canada, finishing in fourth place.

References

1945 births
2014 deaths
British male sport wrestlers
Olympic wrestlers of Great Britain
Wrestlers at the 1968 Summer Olympics
Wrestlers at the 1972 Summer Olympics
Wrestlers at the 1976 Summer Olympics
People from Eccles, Greater Manchester
Commonwealth Games medallists in wrestling
Commonwealth Games silver medallists for England
Wrestlers at the 1974 British Commonwealth Games
Wrestlers at the 1978 Commonwealth Games
Medallists at the 1974 British Commonwealth Games